The Canada men's national floorball team is the men's national floorball team of Canada, and a member of the International Floorball Federation (IFF). Canada's men's team is currently ranked 13th in the world at floorball following their result at the 2012 Men's World Floorball Championships. Their 11th-place ranking after the 2018 Men's World Floorball Championships ties the highest ranking achieved by the men's team has ever achieved at the World Championships.

Canada's main rivals in floorball include Japan, Australia and the United States.

The Canada National Team is organized by Floorball Canada.

World Championships Team
As of February 25th, 2019

Team staff
 General manager - Frank Julien
 Head coach - Otto Moilanen

Rankings & Records

World Rankings

All-Time World Championship Records

Head-to-Head International Records

External links

Official Team Page

Canadian floorball teams
Men's national floorball teams
Floorball